= 8 May 1945 Stadium =

Football stadium in Sétif, Algeria

Coordinates: 36°11′13″N 5°23′35″E

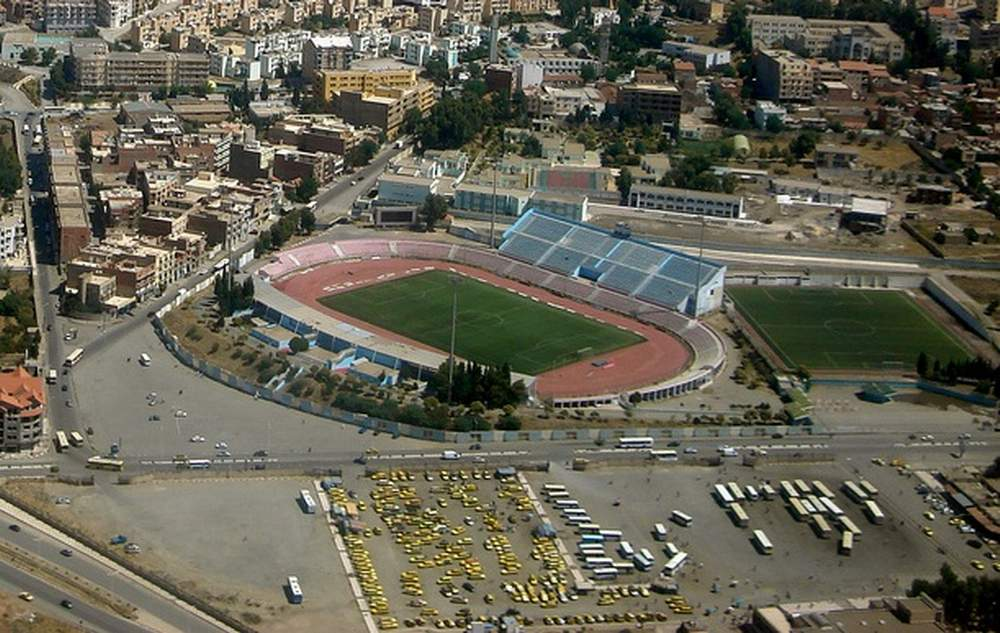
- Interactive map of 8 May 1945 Stadium
- Location: Sétif, Algeria
- Capacity: 25,000
- Surface: Artificial turf

Construction
- Built: 1967
- Opened: 3 May 1972 (54 years ago)
- Renovated: 1994, 1999, 2009

Tenant
- ES Sétif

The 8 May 1945 Stadium (Arabic: ملعب 8 ماي 1945, French: Stade du 8 Mai 1945) is a multi-use stadium in Sétif, Algeria. It is currently used mostly for football matches and is the home ground of ES Sétif. The stadium has a capacity of 25,000 spectators.
